Gustavo Henrique da Silva Sousa (born 29 March 1994), known as Gustagol or simply Gustavo, is a Brazilian footballer who currently plays for Jeonbuk Hyundai Motors as a striker.

Club career

Criciúma
Born in Registro, São Paulo, Gustavo joined Taboão da Serra's youth setup in 2013. On 29 January 2014, after being one of the top goalscorers of the year's Copa São Paulo de Futebol Júnior, he signed for Criciúma.

Gustavo made his senior debut on 16 February 2014, coming on as a second-half substitute for Ricardinho in a 2–1 Campeonato Catarinense home win against Chapecoense. His Série A debut came on 9 August, starting in a 0–0 home draw against Cruzeiro.

On 4 March 2015, after being rarely used, Gustavo was loaned to Resende, for three months. On 13 August he joined Primeira Liga club Nacional, on loan for one year.

Returning to Tigre in 2016, Gustavo became a starter and scored six goals during the season's Catarinense, with two braces against Camboriú and Chapecoense. In Série B, he made his debut by scoring the game's only in a home success over Náutico, and scored a further ten goals before being transferred.

Corinthians
On 23 August 2016, Gustavo moved to Corinthians, who bought 35% of the player's federative rights (Criciúma only owned 70%). He was presented on 3 September, and made his debut for the club five days later by replacing Cristian in a 3–0 home win against Sport.

Career statistics

Honours

Club
Bahia
Copa do Nordeste: 2017
Fortaleza 
Campeonato Brasileiro Série B: 2018
Corinthians
Campeonato Paulista: 2019
Jeonbuk Hyundai Motors
K League 1: 2020
KFA Cup: 2020

Individual
Campeonato Paulista Team of the Year: 2019
KFA Cup Top Scorer: 2020

References

External links

1994 births
Living people
Footballers from São Paulo (state)
Brazilian footballers
Association football forwards
Campeonato Brasileiro Série A players
Campeonato Brasileiro Série B players
Clube Atlético Taboão da Serra players
Criciúma Esporte Clube players
Resende Futebol Clube players
Sport Club Corinthians Paulista players
Esporte Clube Bahia players
Goiás Esporte Clube players
Fortaleza Esporte Clube players
Primeira Liga players
C.D. Nacional players
K League 1 players
Jeonbuk Hyundai Motors players
Brazilian expatriate footballers
Brazilian expatriate sportspeople in Portugal
Brazilian expatriate sportspeople in South Korea
Expatriate footballers in Portugal
Expatriate footballers in South Korea
People from Registro